Mayville Municipal Airport  is a city-owned, public-use airport located one nautical mile (2 km) south of the central business district of Mayville, a city in Traill County, North Dakota, United States.

Facilities and aircraft 
Mayville Municipal Airport covers an area of 160 acres (65 ha) at an elevation of 975 feet (297 m) above mean sea level. It has one runway designated 18/36 with an asphalt surface measuring 3,200 by 56 feet (975 x 17 m).

For the 12-month period ending August 5, 2009, the airport had 5,120 aircraft operations, an average of 14 per day: 98% general aviation, 2% air taxi, and <1% military.

References

External links 
 Mayville Municipal Airport at North Dakota Aeronautics Commission airport directory
 Aerial image as of September 1997 from USGS The National Map

Airports in North Dakota
Buildings and structures in Traill County, North Dakota
Transportation in Traill County, North Dakota